Riots broke out in Trappes, a suburb (banlieue) of Paris, France, on 19 July 2013 after the police arrested a man who assaulted a police officer, who tried to check the identity of his wife wearing a Muslim veil on 18 July 2013.

Background
France officially banned face covering in public places in April 2011. Although disputed by French Muslims, the law remains in effect. On 18 July a 21-year-old Muslim convert was asked by the police to remove her face-covering veil. Her husband tried to choke the officer and was detained. The female was released on 20 July awaiting a court hearing.

The incident is part of the Islamic scarf controversy in France.

Riots
On 19 July hundreds of youths throwing rocks, reportedly mainly of North African ethnicity, attacked the local police station.

On 20 July 20 cars were burned in Trappes.

See also

2005 French riots
2006 Brussels riots
2007 Villiers-le-Bel riots
2009 French riots
2010 Rinkeby riots
2011 England riots
May 2013 Stockholm riots

References

2013 crimes in France
2013 in Islam
2013 riots
2010s in Île-de-France
Arson in France
Arson in the 2010s
Crime in Île-de-France
July 2013 crimes in Europe
July 2013 events in France
Race riots in France
Riots and civil disorder in France
Yvelines